Glen Chorny is a Canadian poker player from Waterloo, Ontario. He is currently a student at Wilfrid Laurier University and has been playing professionally since January 2008. Chorny's first European Poker Tour cash came at the PokerStars Caribbean Poker Adventure in January 2008 when he finished in 13th place. In April, he won the EPT Season 4 Grand Final in Monte Carlo, and by doing so he won the biggest cash prize ever in Europe at €2,020,000 ($3,198,500). As of February 2010, his total live tournament winnings exceeded $3,500,000.

Notes

External links]
 CardPlayer.com Profile
PokerListings.com Interview - Glen Chorny

European Poker Tour winners
Canadian poker players
Living people
Year of birth missing (living people)